The International Old Catholic Bishops' Conference or International Bishops' Conference (IBC) is the synod of bishops of Union of Utrecht of the Old Catholic Churches (UU) member churches.

Background
The International Old Catholic Bishops' Conference was founded in 1889 by the bishops of the Old Catholic Church of the Netherlands, the Catholic Diocese of the Old Catholics in Germany, and the Christian Catholic Church of Switzerland. It is analogous to but not a metropolia. It is similar to the Lambeth Conference of the Anglican Communion. Like the Lambeth Conference, it is not a legislative body.

According to the UU, the responsibilities of the IBC include:
 maintaining community between member churches of the UU
"tak[ing] a stand in controversial questions of faith and related ethical behaviours as well as in church order"
making formal authoritative UU statements about faith and principles 
regulating ecumenical "relationships with other churches and religious communities" 
accepting churches into the UU
accepting bishops into the IBC

The archbishop of the Old Catholic Archdiocese of Utrecht is  president of the IBC. 

The bishops of UU member churches meet yearly.

References

External links
 

Episcopacy
Union of Utrecht of the Old Catholic Churches
Religious organizations established in 1889
Christian organizations established in the 19th century